The PFL 5 mixed martial arts event for the 2022 season of the Professional Fighters League was held on June 24, 2022 at the Overtime Elite Arena in Atlanta, Georgia. This marked the fifth regular season event of the tournament and included fights in the Heavyweight and Featherweight divisions.

Background 
In the main event, 2021 heavyweight champion Bruno Cappelozza faced Matheus Scheffel, with Cappelozza having his second headlining bout of the season following his first-round TKO victory 2022 PFL 2. The co-main event featured a lightweight bout between former UFC lightweight champion Anthony Pettis and fellow UFC veteran Stevie Ray. The rest of the main card saw former UFC vets Chris Wade and Kyle Bochniak facing off in a featherweight bout while heavyweights Renan Ferreira and Klidson Abreu met in a second round bout.

Stuart Austin, Ali Isaev, Jamelle Jones, Saba Bolaghi, Boston Salmon all pulled out of their respective bouts, with the matchups being reorganized and Shelton Graves, Maurice Greene, Juan Adams, Reinaldo Ekson, Ago Huskić stepping in to replace them.

Results

Standings After Event 
The PFL points system is based on results of the match.  The winner of a fight receives 3 points.  If the fight ends in a draw, both fighters will receive 1 point. The bonus for winning a fight in the first, second, or third round is 3 points, 2 points, and 1 point respectively. The bonus for winning in the third round requires a fight be stopped before 4:59 of the third round.  No bonus point will be awarded if a fighter wins via decision.  For example, if a fighter wins a fight in the first round, then the fighter will receive 6 total points. A decision win will result in three total points.  If a fighter misses weight, the opponent (should they comply with weight limits) will receive 3 points due to a walkover victory, regardless of winning or losing the bout;  if the non-offending fighter subsequently wins with a stoppage, all bonus points will be awarded.

Heavyweight

Lightweight

Featherweight

Reported payout 
The following is the reported payout to the fighters as reported to the Georgia Athletic Commission. It is important to note the amounts do not include sponsor money, discretionary bonuses, viewership points or additional earnings.

 Matheus Scheffel: $20,000 ($10,000 show + $10,000 win) def. Bruno Cappelozza: $40,000
 Stevie Ray: $80,000 ($40,000 show + $40,000 win) def. Anthony Pettis: $750,000
 Klidson Abreu: $42,000 ($21,000 show + $21,000 win) def. Renan Ferreira: $19,000
 Chris Wade: $70,000 ($35,000 show + $35,000 win) def. Kyle Bochniak: $15,000
 Ante Delija: $66,000 ($33,000 show + $33,000 win) def. Shelton Graves: $10,000
 Bubba Jenkins: $98,000 ($49,000 show + $49,000) def. Reinaldo Ekson: $10,000
 Denis Goltsov: $70,000 ($35,000 show + $35,000 win) def. Maurice Greene: $18,000
 Lance Palmer: $170,000 ($85,000 show + $85,000 win) def. Sheymon Moraes: $29,000
 Juan Adams: $16,000 ($8,000 show + $8,000 win) def. Sam Kei: $10,000
 Ryoji Kudo: $26,000 ($13,000 show + $13,000 win) def. Alejandro Flores: $26,000
 Brendan Loughnane: $170,000 ($85,000 show + $85,000 win) def. Ago Huskic: $10,000

Aftermath 
On September 23, it was announced that the Georgia Athletic and Entertainment Commission overturned the result of the bout between Klidson Abreu and Renan Ferreira to a no contest, after Abreu failed a drug test for unspecified substances. Klidson and his team contended that the positive was due to prescribed antibiotics for a leg laceration.

See also 
 List of PFL events
 List of current PFL fighters

Notes

References 

Events in Atlanta
Professional Fighters League
2022 in mixed martial arts
June 2022 sports events in the United States